"Shake That!" is a song by German band Scooter. It was released in October 2004 as the second single from their tenth studio album Mind The Gap.

Track listing
CD Single
"Shake That!" [Radio Version] (3:18)
"Shake That!" [Extended Version] (5:03)
"Shake That!" [Clubmix] (5:28)
"Shake That!" [CJ Stone Mix] (6:36)
"Suffix" (2:55)

Limited Edition CD Single
"Shake That!" [Radio Edit] (3:18)
"Shake That!" [Extended] (5:03)
"Shake That!" [Steve Murano Mix] (5:43)
"Shake That!" [Klubbheads Klubb Dubb] (3:17)
"Hyper Hyper" [Special Live Version] (6:14)

12" Single
"Shake That!" [Extended Version] (5:03)
"Shake That!" [Clubmix] (5:28)

Download
"Shake That!" [Radio Version] (3:18)
"Shake That!" [Club Mix] (5:28)
"Shake That!" [Extended Version] (5:03)
"Suffix" (2:55)

Samples
"Shake That!" samples both the song "After Dark" by Tito & Tarantula, taken from the 1996 soundtrack to the film From Dusk Till Dawn and the chorus of the KC & The Sunshine Band song "(Shake, Shake, Shake) Shake Your Booty" from the 1976 album Part 3.

Chart performance

Weekly charts

Year-end charts

References

Scooter (band) songs
2004 singles
Songs written by H.P. Baxxter
Songs written by Harry Wayne Casey
Songs written by Richard Finch (musician)
Songs written by Rick J. Jordan
Songs written by Jens Thele
2004 songs
Number-one singles in Hungary